John Alexander McNab (14 December 1895 – 23 July 1979) was a New Zealand rugby union player. A flanker, McNab represented  at a provincial level, and was a member of the New Zealand national side, the All Blacks, in 1925. Considered unlucky to have missed selection for the 1924–1925 tour of Britain, Ireland and France, he was named in the team for the 1925 tour of New South Wales, but only appeared in one match against  before contracting appendicitis.

References

1895 births
1979 deaths
Rugby union players from Hastings, New Zealand
People educated at Hastings Boys' High School
New Zealand rugby union players
New Zealand international rugby union players
Hawke's Bay rugby union players
Rugby union flankers